The following is a list of the MTV Europe Music Award winners for Global Icon.

2010s

Video Visionary Award.
Rock Icon Award.

References 

MTV Europe Music Awards
Awards established in 2008